The  is a Japanese Grade 1 flat horse race in Japan. The race is restricted to three-year-old Thoroughbred fillies and is run over a distance of 1,600 metres (approximately 1 mile) at the Hanshin Racecourse, Takarazuka, Hyōgo in April.

It was first run in 1939 and is the Japanese equivalent of the English 1,000 Guineas.

The race was run at Nakayama Racecourse until 1944 when it was run at Tokyo Racecourse. After a two year hiatus the Oka Sho was staged at Kyoto Racecourse from 1947 to 1949. The race was also run at Kyoto in 1967, 1991 and 1995.

Winners of the Oka Sho usually go on to contest the Yushun Himba and the double has been completed by Sweet Sue (1952), Yamaichi, Miss Onward, Kane Keyaki, Tesco Gaby, Titania, Mejiro Ramonu, Max Beauty, Vega, Still In Love, Buena Vista, Apapane, Gentildonna, Almond Eye and Daring Tact. Still In Love, Apapane, Gentildonna and Almond Eye went on to take the Shuka Sho and secure the Japanese Fillies' Triple Crown.

Winners since 1990

Earlier winners 

 1939 - Soul Lady
 1940 - Tairei
 1941 - Brand Sol
 1942 - Banner Goal
 1943 - Miss Theft
 1944 - Yamaiwai
 1945 - no race
 1946 - no race
 1947 - Browny
 1948 - Hamakaze
 1949 - Yashima Daughter
 1950 - Tosa Mitsuru
 1951 - Tsuki Kawa
 1952 - Swee Sue
 1953 - Kansei
 1954 - Yamaichi
 1955 - Yashima Belle
 1956 - Miss Lilas
 1957 - Miss Onward
 1958 - Hoshu Queen
 1959 - Kiyo Take
 1960 - Tokino Kiroku
 1961 - Sugi Hime
 1962 - Kenho
 1963 - Miss Masako
 1964 - Kane Keyaki
 1965 - Hatsuyuki
 1966 - Wakakumo
 1967 - Sea Ace
 1968 - Koyu
 1969 - Hide Kotobuki
 1970 - Tamami
 1971 - Nasuno Kaori
 1972 - Achieve Star
 1973 - Nitto Chodori
 1974 - Takaeno Kaori
 1975 - Tesco Gaby
 1976 - Titania
 1977 - Inter Gloria
 1978 - Oyama Tesco
 1979 - Horsemen Tesco
 1980 - Hagino Top Lady
 1981 - Brocade
 1982 - Riesengross
 1983 - Shadai Sophia
 1984 - Diana Tholon
 1985 - Erebus
 1986 - Mejiro Ramonu
 1987 - Max Beauty
 1988 - Ara Hotoku
 1989 - Shadai Kagura

See also
 Horse racing in Japan
 List of Japanese flat horse races

References 
Racing Post: 

Turf races in Japan
Flat horse races for three-year-old fillies